The 2015–16 ACB season was the 33rd season of the Spanish basketball league, also called Liga Endesa in its sponsored identity. The regular season started on October 10, 2015, and ended on May 22, 2016. The playoffs was played from May 26 to June 26, 2016.

Teams

Promotion and relegation (pre-season)
A total of 18 teams contest the league, including 16 sides from the 2014–15 season and two promoted from the 2014–15 LEB Oro.
Teams promoted from LEB Oro
Ford Burgos (did not fulfill the requirements, its place was offered RETAbet.es GBC)
Club Ourense Baloncesto (despite the club fulfilled the requirements, the assembly of the league did not admit after did not pass the audit. Its place was offered to Montakit Fuenlabrada)

Venues and locations

Personnel and sponsorship

Notes
1. Cultura del Esfuerzo is the motto of the club.

Managerial changes

Regular season

League table

Positions by round
The table lists the positions of teams after completion of each round.

Results

Playoffs

Final standings

Attendances
Attendances include playoff games:

Statistics

| width=50% valign=top |

Rebounds

|}
|}

| width=50% valign=top |

Performance Index Rating

|}
|}Source: ACB

ACB clubs in European competitions

Awards
All official awards of the 2015–16 ACB season.

MVP

Source:

Finals MVP

Source:

All-ACB Teams

Source:

Best Young Player Award

Source:

Best All-Young Team

Source:

Player of the week

Source:

Player of the month

Source:

References and notes

External links
 ACB.com 
 linguasport.com 

 
Liga ACB seasons

 
Spain